In algebraic number theory, the genus field Γ(K) of an algebraic number field K is the maximal abelian extension of K which is obtained by composing an absolutely abelian field with K and which is  unramified at all finite primes of K.  The genus number of K is the degree [Γ(K):K] and the genus group is the Galois group of Γ(K) over K.

If K is itself absolutely abelian, the genus field may be described as the maximal absolutely abelian extension of K unramified at all finite primes: this definition was used by Leopoldt and Hasse.

If K=Q() (m squarefree) is a quadratic field of discriminant D, the genus field of K is a composite of quadratic fields.  Let pi run over the prime factors of D.  For each such prime p, define p∗ as follows:

Then the genus field is the composite

See also
 Hilbert class field

References
 
 
 

Class field theory